Villebois is an unconstituted locality within the municipality of Baie-James in the Nord-du-Québec region of Quebec, Canada.

Demographics 

References

Communities in Nord-du-Québec
Designated places in Quebec
Unconstituted localities in Quebec